Kong Vibol ; is a Cambodian politician. He belongs to the Cambodian People's Party (CPP).  

Kong Vibol is the Secretary of State, Ministry of Economy and Finance and vice-chairman of the Council for the Development of Cambodia, (CDC).

References

Cambodian People's Party politicians
Living people
Year of birth missing (living people)